Robert Bourne, M.D. (1761–1829) was an English physician and professor of medicine.

Life
Bourne was born at Shrawley, Worcestershire, and educated at Bromsgrove. He was elected a scholar of Worcester College, Oxford, and became a Fellow of the college. He proceeded B.A. in 1781, M.A. in 1784, M.B. in 1786, and in 1787 took the degree of M.D. and was elected physician to the Radcliffe Infirmary at Oxford.

In 1790 he became a fellow of the Royal College of Physicians. In 1794 he was appointed reader of chemistry at Oxford. He was Harveian Orator in 1797. In 1803 he was the Aldrichian professor of physic, and in 1824 Lichfield professor of clinical medicine.

He died at Oxford on 23 December 1829. A monument was erected to him in the chapel of his college.

Works
His published works are:
 'An Introductory Lecture to a Course of Chemistry,' 1797
 'Cases of Pulmonary Consumption treated with Uva ursi,' 1805

References

External links
 Grave of Bourne's grandson Thomas Henry Bridges — Information about Robert Bourne and his children

1761 births
1829 deaths
18th-century English medical doctors
People from Malvern Hills District
18th-century English non-fiction writers
18th-century English male writers
18th-century English writers
19th-century English non-fiction writers
English science writers
19th-century English medical doctors
Alumni of Worcester College, Oxford
Fellows of Worcester College, Oxford
English medical writers
Medical doctors from Worcestershire